Jerome McCarthy (born 6 April 1973) is a South African former footballer who played at both professional and international levels as a midfielder.

Career
McCarthy played club football for Santos and Manning Rangers. In January 2003 he pleaded guilty to doping offences, and received a fine and community service as punishment.

He also played international football for South Africa.

Personal life
He is the brother of Benni McCarthy. He was arrested with R8.7 million (over $600k) worth of Mandrax in November 2020.  He was granted R100 000 bail.

References

1973 births
Living people
South African soccer players
South Africa international soccer players
Santos F.C. (South Africa) players
Manning Rangers F.C. players
Association football midfielders